A Topit is a pocket installed inside a jacket used by magicians to dispose of objects secretly.  It plays a similar role in the magician's toolkit to pulls, holdouts, servantes, and techniques such as sleeving or lapping.    While the original Topit booklet by Patrick Page was put out by Lewis Davenport Ltd. in London decades ago, it was Michael Ammar who popularized the Topit with his refinement of Topit technique and inspired a number of well-known close-up magicians to adopt it.

Topits were employed by pickpockets and thieves during the 19th century. This primitive form of the topit was called the "Poacher's Pouch".
The art of Topit has developed, like some other forms of magic, in symbiotic relationship between magicians and grifters, both considered sleight of hand artists.

References

Magic (illusion)